The 1996–97 Argentine Primera División was the 106th season of top-flight football in Argentina. The season ran from August 23, 1996, to August 13, 1997. Huracán Corrientes (champion of 1995–96 Primera B Nacional) and Unión de Santa Fe promoted from Primera B Nacional.

River Plate won both, Apertura and Clausura championships (27th. and 28th. league titles). On the other hand, Huracán Corrientes and Banfield were relegated with the worst points averages.

Torneo Apertura

League standings

Fixtures

Top scorers

Torneo Clausura

League standings

Fixtures

Top scorers

Relegation
Banfield and Huracán de Corrientes were relegated with the worst points averages.

See also
1996–97 in Argentine football

References 

Argentine Primera División seasons
1996–97 in Argentine football
Argentine
Argentine